Schlapbach is a surname. Notable people with the surname include:

 Susan Schlapbach, Swiss female curler
 Ursula Schlapbach, Swiss female curler